The GRG 12 Erlgasse is a secondary school in Vienna, the capital of Austria. GRG stands for "Gymnasium und Realgymnasium" and means "secondary school and secondary school with emphasis on sciences". The number 12 says that the school is resident in Meidling, the 12th district of Vienna.
One of the former students is Austria's chancellor Sebastian Kurz (Matura in 2004).

External links 
 

Buildings and structures in Meidling
Schools in Vienna